Lo imperdonable (English: The Unforgivable), is a Mexican telenovela produced by Ernesto Alonso for Televisa in 1975. Based on an original story by Caridad Bravo Adams and Fernanda Villeli. Amparo Rivelles, Armando Silvestre and Rogelio Guerra star as the protagonists, while Raquel Olmedo and Marilú Elizaga star as the antagonists.

In the year 2000, a new adaptation of Lo imperdonable was held, under the title of Siempre te amaré.

Cast

References

External links 

Mexican telenovelas
Televisa telenovelas
1975 telenovelas
Spanish-language telenovelas
1975 Mexican television series debuts
1975 Mexican television series endings